Ratra are a Punjabi clan found in Punjab region of Pakistan and India. Muslim Ratras live in Pakistan while Hindu and Sikh live in India. 

Before independence of Pakistan in 1947, the Hindu and Sikh Ratras migrated to India, and who were left in Pakistan gradually were converted to Islam and are called now Muslim Ratras settled in Pakistan.

The Ratras are a sub clan of Rajput.

References

Punjabi tribes
Social groups of Pakistan